The Regiment is a computer game developed by Kuju London and released by Konami in 2006. It is based on the Special Air Service, and includes some real-life missions such as the Iranian Embassy siege.

See also
List of Konami games

References

External links
Official site

Konami games
2006 video games
First-person shooters
Video games about the Special Air Service
Video games scored by Nathan McCree
Video games developed in the United Kingdom
Video games set in London
Video games set in the United Kingdom
Windows games
Windows-only games